Cuan Na Grai (born 27 May 2001) is an Irish thoroughbred racehorse whose hurdling career was highlighted in 2006 when he won the Galway Hurdle at the Galway Festival. By Erins Isle and out of Volnost, the eight-year-old is owned by John Brennan and trained by Paul Nolan in Enniscorthy, County Wexford, Ireland. His name  has several meanings in Irish but translates as Stud Bay in the eyes of his owner.

Cuan Na Grai featured in the 2010 Liz Mermin documentary 'Horses', which followed a year in the life of 3 horses at Paul Nolan's Stable, also including Joncol and Ardalan.

References 
 RTE reports on Cuan Na Grai's famous Galway win
 Racing Post Cuan Na Grai file
 Paul Nolan's website
 Horse Racing Ireland trainer information

2001 racehorse births
Racehorses bred in Ireland
Racehorses trained in Ireland
Thoroughbred family 7-a